The Hoffman X-1 Sweet Patootie is an American homebuilt aircraft designed by Edward C. Hoffman, first flying on 24 February 1960.

Design and development
The Hoffman "Sweet Patootie" is a single place, low-wing, conventional landing gear-equipped aircraft.

Specifications (X1)

References

External links
Image of a X-1

Homebuilt aircraft